Trachoma is an infectious disease caused by bacterium Chlamydia trachomatis. The infection causes a roughening of the inner surface of the eyelids. This roughening can lead to pain in the eyes, breakdown of the outer surface or cornea of the eyes, and eventual blindness. Untreated, repeated trachoma infections can result in a form of permanent blindness when the eyelids turn inward.

The bacteria that cause the disease can be spread by both direct and indirect contact with an affected person's eyes or nose. Indirect contact includes through clothing or flies that have come into contact with an affected person's eyes or nose. Children spread the disease more often than adults. Poor sanitation, crowded living conditions, and not enough clean water and toilets also increase spread.

Efforts to prevent the disease include improving access to clean water and treatment with antibiotics to decrease the number of people infected with the bacterium. This may include treating, all at once, whole groups of people in whom the disease is known to be common. Washing, by itself, is not enough to prevent disease, but may be useful with other measures. Treatment options include oral azithromycin and topical tetracycline. Azithromycin is preferred because it can be used as a single oral dose. After scarring of the eyelid has occurred, surgery may be required to correct the position of the eyelashes and prevent blindness.

Globally, about 80 million people have an active infection. In some areas, infections may be present in as many as 60–90% of children. Among adults, it more commonly affects women than men – likely due to their closer contact with children. The disease is the cause of decreased vision in 2.2 million people, of whom 1.2 million are completely blind. Trachoma is a public health problem in 44 countries across Africa, Asia, the Pacific Islands, and Central and South America. There are 136.9 million people at risk. It results in US$8 billion of economic losses a year. It belongs to a group of diseases known as neglected tropical diseases.

Signs and symptoms
The bacterium has an incubation period of 6 to 12 days, after which the affected individual experiences symptoms of conjunctivitis, or irritation similar to "pink eye". Blinding endemic trachoma results from multiple episodes of reinfection that maintains the intense inflammation in the conjunctiva. Without reinfection, the inflammation gradually subsides.

The conjunctival inflammation is called "active trachoma" and usually is seen in children, especially preschool children. It is characterized by white lumps in the undersurface of the upper eyelid (conjunctival follicles or lymphoid germinal centres) and by nonspecific inflammation and thickening often associated with papillae. Follicles may also appear at the junction of the cornea and the sclera (limbal follicles). Active trachoma often can be irritating and have a watery discharge. Bacterial secondary infection may occur and cause a purulent discharge.

The later structural changes of trachoma are referred to as "cicatricial trachoma". These include scarring in the eyelid (tarsal conjunctiva) that leads to distortion of the eyelid with buckling of the lid (tarsus) so the lashes rub on the eye (trichiasis). These lashes can lead to corneal opacities and scarring and then to blindness. Linear scars present in the sulcus subtarsalis are called Arlt's lines (named after Carl Ferdinand von Arlt). In addition, blood vessels and scar tissue can invade the upper cornea (pannus). Resolved limbal follicles may leave small gaps in the pannus (Herbert's pits).

Most commonly, children with active trachoma do not present with any symptoms, as the low-grade irritation and ocular discharge is just accepted as normal, but further symptoms may include:
 Eye discharge
 Swollen eyelids
 Trichiasis (misdirected eyelashes)
 Swelling of lymph nodes in front of the ears
 Sensitivity to bright lights
 Increased heart rate
 Further ear, nose, and throat complications.
The major complication or the most important one is corneal ulcer occurring due to rubbing by concentrations, or trichiasis with superimposed bacterial infection.

Cause 
Trachoma is caused by Chlamydia trachomatis, serotypes (serovars) A, B, and C. It is spread by direct contact with eye, nose, and throat secretions from affected individuals, or contact with fomites (inanimate objects that carry infectious agents), such as towels and/or washcloths, that have had similar contact with these secretions. Flies can also be a route of mechanical transmission. Untreated, repeated trachoma infections result in entropion (the inward turning of the eyelids), which may result in blindness due to damage to the cornea. Children are the most susceptible to infection due to their tendency to get dirty easily, but the blinding effects or more severe symptoms are often not felt until adulthood.

Blinding endemic trachoma occurs in areas with poor personal and family hygiene. Many factors are indirectly linked to the presence of trachoma including lack of water, absence of latrines or toilets, poverty in general, flies, close proximity to cattle, and crowding. The final common pathway, though, seems to be the presence of dirty faces in children, facilitating the frequent exchange of infected ocular discharge from one child's face to another.  Most transmission of trachoma occurs within the family.

Diagnosis

McCallan's classification
McCallan in 1908 divided the clinical course of trachoma into four stages:

WHO classification
The World Health Organization recommends a simplified grading system for trachoma. The Simplified WHO Grading System is summarized below:

Trachomatous inflammation, follicular (TF)—Five or more follicles of >0.5 mm on the upper tarsal conjunctiva

Trachomatous inflammation, intense (TI)—Papillary hypertrophy and inflammatory thickening of the upper tarsal conjunctiva obscuring more than half the deep tarsal vessels

Trachomatous scarring (TS)—Presence of scarring in tarsal conjunctiva.

Trachomatous trichiasis (TT)—At least one ingrown eyelash touching the globe, or evidence of epilation (eyelash removal)

Corneal opacity (CO)—Corneal opacity blurring part of the pupil margin

Prevention
Although trachoma was eliminated from much of the developed world in the 20th century (Australia being a notable exception), this disease persists in many parts of the developing world, particularly in communities without adequate access to water and sanitation.

Environmental measures
Environmental improvement: Modifications in water use, fly control, latrine use, health education, and proximity to domesticated animals have all been proposed to reduce transmission of C. trachomatis. These changes pose numerous challenges for implementation. These environmental changes are likely to ultimately affect the transmission of ocular infection by means of lack of facial cleanliness. Particular attention is required for environmental factors that limit clean faces.

A systematic review examining the effectiveness of environmental sanitary measures on the prevalence of active trachoma in endemic areas showed that use of insecticide spray resulted in significant reductions of trachoma and fly density in some studies. Health education also resulted in reductions of active trachoma when implemented.  Improved water supply did not result in a reduction of trachoma incidence.

Antibiotics
WHO Guidelines recommend that a region should receive community-based, mass antibiotic treatment when the prevalence of active trachoma among one- to nine-year-old children is greater than 10%. Subsequent annual treatment should be administered for three years, at which time the prevalence should be reassessed. Annual treatment should continue until the prevalence drops below 5%. At lower prevalences, antibiotic treatment should be family-based.

Management

Antibiotics
Azithromycin (single oral dose of 20 mg/kg) or topical tetracycline (1% eye ointment twice a day for six weeks). Azithromycin is preferred because it is used as a single oral dose. Although it is expensive, it is generally used as part of the international donation program organized by Pfizer. Azithromycin can be used in children from the age of six months and in pregnancy. As a community-based antibiotic treatment, some evidence suggests that oral azithromycin was more effective than topical tetracycline, but no consistent evidence supported either oral or topical antibiotics as being more effective. Antibiotic treatment reduces the risk of active trachoma in individuals infected with chlamydial trachomatis.

Surgery
For individuals with trichiasis, a bilamellar tarsal rotation procedure is warranted to direct the lashes away from the globe. Evidence suggests that use of a lid clamp and absorbable sutures would result in reduced lid contour abnormalities and granuloma formulation after surgery. Early intervention is beneficial as the rate of recurrence is higher in more advanced disease.

Lifestyle measures

The WHO-recommended SAFE strategy includes:
 Surgery to correct advanced stages of the disease
 Antibiotics to treat active infection, using azithromycin
 Facial cleanliness to reduce disease transmission
 Environmental change to increase access to clean water and improved sanitation

Children with visible nasal discharge, discharge from the eyes, or flies on their faces are at least twice as likely to have active trachoma as children with clean faces. Intensive community-based health education programs to promote face-washing can reduce the rates of active trachoma, especially intense trachoma. If an individual is already infected, washing one's face is encouraged, especially a child,  to prevent reinfection. Some evidence shows that washing the face combined with topical tetracycline might be more effective in reducing severe trachoma compared to topical tetracycline alone. The same trial found no statistical benefit of eye washing alone or in combination with tetracycline eye drops in reducing follicular trachoma amongst children.

Prognosis
If not treated properly with oral antibiotics, the symptoms may escalate and cause blindness, which is the result of ulceration and consequent scarring of the cornea.  Surgery may also be necessary to fix eyelid deformities.

Without intervention, trachoma keeps families in a cycle of poverty, as the disease and its long-term effects are passed from one generation to the next.

Epidemiology

As of 2011, about 21 million people are actively affected by trachoma, with around 2.2 million people being permanently blind or have severe visual impairment from trachoma. An additional 7.3 million people are reported to have trichiasis. As of June 2022, 125 million individuals live in trachoma endemic areas and are at risk of trachoma-related blindness, and the disease is a public health problem in 42 countries. Of these, Africa is considered the worst affected area, with over 85% of all known active cases of trachoma.  Within the continent, South Sudan and Ethiopia have the highest prevalence. In many of these communities, women are three times more likely than men to be blinded by the disease, likely due to their roles as caregivers in the family. Australia is the only developed country that has trachoma. In 2008, trachoma was found in half of Australia's very remote communities.

Elimination
In 1996, the WHO launched its Alliance for the Global Elimination of Trachoma by 2020, and in 2006, the WHO officially set 2020 as the target to eliminate trachoma as a public-health problem. The International Coalition for Trachoma Control  has produced maps and a strategic plan called 2020 INSight that lays out actions and milestones to achieve global elimination of blinding trachoma by  2020. The program recommends the SAFE protocol for blindness prevention: Surgery for trichiasis, Antibiotics to clear infection, Facial cleanliness, and Environmental improvement to reduce transmission. This includes sanitation infrastructure to reduce the open presence of human feces that can breed flies.

As of 2018, Cambodia, Ghana, Iran, Laos, Mexico, Nepal, Morocco, and Oman have been certified as having eliminated trachoma as a public-health problem; China, Gambia, Iran, Iraq, and Myanmar make that claim, but have not sought certification. Eradication of the bacterium that causes the disease is seen as impractical; the WHO definition of "eliminated as a public-health problem" means less than 5% of children have any symptoms, and less than 0.1% of adults have vision loss. Having already donated more doses (about 700 million since 2002) of the drug than it has sold during the same time period, the drug company Pfizer has agreed to donate azithromycin until 2025, if necessary, for elimination of the disease. The campaign unexpectedly found distribution of azithromycin to very poor children reduced their early death rate by up to 25%.

History
The disease is one of the earliest known eye afflictions, having been identified in Egypt as early as 15 BC.

Its presence was also recorded in ancient China and Mesopotamia. Trachoma became a problem as people moved into crowded settlements or towns where hygiene was poor. It became a particular problem in Europe in the 19th century. After the Egyptian Campaign (1798–1802) and the Napoleonic Wars (1798–1815), trachoma was rampant in the army barracks of Europe and spread to those living in towns as troops returned home. Stringent control measures were introduced, and by the early 20th century, trachoma was essentially controlled in Europe, although cases were reported until the 1950s. Today, most victims of trachoma live in underdeveloped and poverty-stricken countries in Africa, the Middle East, and Asia.

In the United States, the Centers for Disease Control says, "No national or international surveillance [for trachoma] exists. Blindness due to trachoma has been eliminated from the United States. The last cases were found among Native American populations and in Appalachia, and those in the boxing, wrestling, and sawmill industries (prolonged exposure to combinations of sweat and sawdust often led to the disease). In the late 19th and early 20th centuries, trachoma was the main reason for an immigrant coming through Ellis Island to be deported."

In 1913, President Woodrow Wilson signed an act designating funds for the eradication of the disease. Immigrants who attempted to enter the U.S. through Ellis Island, New York, had to be checked for trachoma. During this time, treatment for the disease was by topical application of copper sulfate. By the late 1930s, a number of ophthalmologists reported success in treating trachoma with sulfonamide antibiotics. In 1948, Vincent Tabone (who was later to become the President of Malta) was entrusted with the supervision of a campaign in Malta to treat trachoma using sulfonamide tablets and drops.

Due to improved sanitation and overall living conditions, trachoma virtually disappeared from the industrialized world by the 1950s, though it continues to plague the developing world to this day. Epidemiological studies were conducted in 1956–1963 by the Trachoma Control Pilot Project in India under the Indian Council for Medical Research. This potentially blinding disease remains endemic in the poorest regions of Africa, Asia, and the Middle East and in some parts of Latin America and Australia. Currently, 8 million people are visually impaired as a result of trachoma, and 41 million have an active infection.

Of the 54 countries that the WHO cited as still having blinding trachoma occurring, Australia is the only developed country—Australian Aboriginal people who live in remote communities with inadequate sanitation are still blinded by this infectious eye disease.

India's Health and Family Welfare Minister JP Nadda declared India free of infective trachoma in 2017.

Etymology
The term is derived from New Latin , from Greek τράχωμα , from τραχύς  "rough".

Economics 
The economic burden of trachoma is huge, particularly with regard to covering treatment costs and productivity losses as a result of increased visual impairment, and in some cases, permanent blindness. The global estimated cost of trachoma is reported between $US2.9 and 5.3 billion each year. By including the cost for trichiasis treatment, the estimated overall cost for the disease increases to about $US 8 billion.

References

External links
 
 Celia W. Dugger (31 March 2006), "Preventable Disease Blinds Poor in Third World", The New York Times
 Photographs of trachoma patients
 Trachoma Atlas
 International Trachoma Initiative

Blindness
Eye diseases
Tropical diseases
Chlamydia infections
Infectious diseases with eradication efforts
Wikipedia medicine articles ready to translate
Wikipedia infectious disease articles ready to translate